The Calucones were a Gallic or Rhaetian tribe dwelling around present-day Chur (eastern Switzerland) during the Roman period.

Name 
They are mentioned as Calucones (var. Callucones, Allucones) by Pliny (1st c. AD), and as kaloúkōnes (καλούκωνες; var. καλούκονες, κουλούκωνες) by Ptolemy (2nd c. AD).

The etymology of the name remains debated. It could go back to a Celtic form calo-uco-on-, derived from the stem calo- ('call'). Alternatively, it may be derived from a stem *calu- ('hard') attached to -cones ('wolves'), and translated as 'hard wolves'.

An homonym tribe, the Kaloukones, lived further north, near the Germanic Suebi.

Geography 
The Calucones probably dwelled around present-day Chur (Curia), in the Canton of Grisons. 

Their territory was located north of the Suanetes and Rugusci, west of the Focunates and Venostes, south of the Vennones.

History 
They are mentioned by Pliny the Elder as one of the Alpine tribes conquered by Rome in 16–15 BC, and whose name was engraved on the Tropaeum Alpium.

References

Primary sources

Bibliography

See also
Rhaetian people

Ancient Switzerland
Raetia
Tribes conquered by Rome